The Special Operations Unit (ROS) was an Albanian special forces unit, under the authority of the country's Ministry of the Interior. It was based in the western port city of Durrës. Founded in February 2000, it was used principally against organised crime. It was disbanded in 2002.

The commander of ROS was Abedin Lame. This is the most elite Albanian military special operation unit called Reparti i Operacioneve Speciale (ROS). ROS is counterterrorist unit, this one administrated by British SAS operators. It was founded in February 2000 and code named "77", this unit also falls under the Ministry of the Interior and is based in Durrës.

This unit also has intelligence duties and is used primarily against organized crime elements. They use a mix of Western and Warsaw Pact weapons and its trainees undergo a particularly rigorous selection program

See also
 RENEA
 Shqiponjat
 FNSH

References

Special forces of Albania
Law enforcement in Albania